Mustard Seed Faith was an American Jesus music group from Costa Mesa, California.

Mustard Seed Faith was one of several groups formed by members of Calvary Chapel Costa Mesa in the late 1960s and early 1970s; others included Daniel Amos and Sweet Comfort Band. Mustard Seed Faith's first releases were songs on Maranatha! Music compilations: "Happy in Jesus", released in 1973 on Maranatha Three, "All I Know" in 1974 on Maranatha Four and "Sidney the Pirate" in 1976 on Maranatha Five. The group's only album for Maranatha, Sail On Sailor, was released in 1975 and featured album art by Rick Griffin.

The group toured extensively from 1970 to 1977. They disbanded in 1977 partly due to "road touring fatigue." They reunited in 1980 to independently issue a second full-length album. Members Oden Fong and Lewis McVay went on to pursue solo careers.

Members
Earliest version
 Wade Link — guitar, vocals
 Pedro Buford — keyboards, flute, vocals
 Dan Leist — vocals, harmonica

Second version
 Pedro Buford 
 Oden Fong — vocals, guitars 
 Lewis McVay — vocals, drums & acoustic guitar
 John Belles — electric bass

Third  version
 Lewis McVay — lead vocals, now playing guitar only
 Darrell Cook — electric bass
 Steve Berchtold — drums
 Pedro Buford 
 Oden Fong

Discography
Sail On Sailor (Maranatha! Music, 1975)
"The Question"
"Let Go"
"Can't Work Your Way to Heaven"
"Once I Had a Dream"
"Dried Up Well"
"Sail On Sailor"
"Lighter Side of Darkness"
"Sweet Jesus Morning"
"More Than Sunlight"
"Back Home"
Limited Edition (independent, 1980)

References

Christian rock groups from California
People from Costa Mesa, California
1970 establishments in California
Musical groups established in 1970
Musical groups disestablished in 1977
Musical groups reestablished in 1980
Musical groups disestablished in 1980